American Princess is an American comedy-drama television series created by Jamie Denbo that premiered on June 2, 2019, on Lifetime. Denbo wrote for the series and executive produced alongside Jenji Kohan and Tara Herrmann. On August 29, 2019, Lifetime canceled the series after one season.

Premise
American Princess follows "Amanda, an Upper East Side socialite, who runs off to join a Renaissance Faire after her wedding goes awry. Amanda’s storybook wedding plans are dramatically derailed when she discovers her fiancé is cheating on her, just hours before they are to be wed. Outraged, Amanda reacts violently to the indiscretions and runs away from her own dream wedding in the countryside, only to find herself stranded in the middle of a Renaissance Faire with no phone and no way home. She soon discovers her outburst has made tabloid headlines and experiences a nervous breakdown, leading her to re-evaluate her life. The unexpected awakening leads Amanda to leave everything she thought she cared about behind, to become the Faire’s newest wench-in-waiting."

Cast and characters

Main

Georgia Flood as Amanda Klein
Lucas Neff as David
Seana Kofoed as Maggie
Rory O’Malley as Brian
Mary Hollis Inboden as Delilah

Recurring

Lesley Ann Warren as Joanntha
Max Ehrich as Brett
Mimi Gianopulos as Morgan
Helen Madelyn Kim as Lexi
Tommy Dorfman as Nick
Taylor Gray as Jose
Erin Pineda as Helen
Matt Peters as Shart O’Belly
Lucas Hazlett as Stick
Lex King as Callie
Steve Agee as Lee
Kitana Turnbull as Breeze
Mike Lane as Bo
Juan Alfonso as Juan Andres, aka "Faire Bear"
Sophie von Haselberg as Natasha
Sas Goldberg as Erin Klein-Fagel
Patrick Gallagher as Friar Woodruff
Tyler Ghyzel as 'Lil Boy'

Episodes

Production

Development
On August 10, 2017, it was announced that Lifetime had given a series order to American Princess, a new television series created and written by Jamie Denbo. The series order was reportedly for a first season of ten episodes in which Denbo will also executive produce alongside Jenji Kohan and Tara Herrmann. Production companies involved in the series include A+E Studios and IM Global Television. On April 26, 2018, it was reported that Claire Scanlon would direct for the series. On June 29, 2018, it was clarified that she would be directing the pilot episode and the season finale. On February 6, 2019, it was announced that the series would premiere on June 2, 2019.

Casting
On April 24, 2018, it was announced that Georgia Flood, Lucas Neff, Seana Kofoed, Rory O’Malley, and Mary Hollis Inboden had joined the main cast as series regulars. On May 24, 2018, it was reported that Lesley Ann Warren and Max Ehrich had been cast in recurring roles. In July 2018, it was reported that Mimi Gianopulos, Helen Madelyn Kim, Tommy Dorfman, Erin Pineda, Matt Peters, Lucas Hazlett, Lex King, Steve Agee, Kitana Turnbull, Mike Lane, Juan Alfonso, Sophie Von Haselberg, Sas Goldberg, and Patrick Gallagher would appear in a recurring capacity.

Filming
Principal photography for the first season began on July 6, 2018 in Los Angeles, California.

Release
On February 9, 2019, the first trailer for the series was released.

Reception

Critical response
On the review aggregator website Rotten Tomatoes, the series has an approval rating of 71% based on 7 reviews, with an average rating of 6.81/10.

Ratings

References

External links

2010s American comedy-drama television series
2019 American television series debuts
2019 American television series endings
English-language television shows
Lifetime (TV network) original programming
Television shows filmed in California
Television shows filmed in Los Angeles